The following is a list of resident commissioners of Niue from its annexation by New Zealand in 1901 to its independence as a self-governing nation in free association with New Zealand in October 1974. Since that date, the representative of New Zealand in Niue has been the High Commissioner of New Zealand to Niue.

List of colonial heads of Niue

See also
History of Niue

External links
 Government of Niue, Brief Chronological Events, 2001.
 Niue, Worldstatesmen.org, 2015.

History of Niue
Colonial heads
Government of Niue
Niue